1976 Soviet Second League was a Soviet competition in the Soviet Second League.

Qualifying groups

Group I [Soviet republics]

Group II [Central Asia]

Group III [Central Russia]

Group IV [Russian South]

Group V [Siberia and the Far East]

Group VI (Ukraine)

Promotion playoffs
 [Nov 1, 5]
 Guria Lanchkhuti     0-0 0-2  URALMASH Sverdlovsk 
 Meliorator Yangiyer  1-1 2-3  DINAMO Leningrad 
 Mashuk Pyatigorsk    1-0 0-2  Krivbass Krivoi Rog

Additional finals 
 [Nov 11]
 KRIVBASS Krivoi Rog  3-0 Mashuk Pyatigorsk [in Simferopol]

References
 All-Soviet Archive Site
 Results. RSSSF

Soviet Second League seasons
3
Soviet
Soviet